Palasport Biella is an indoor sporting arena located in Biella, Italy.  The capacity of the arena is 3,508 people and it opened in 1993. It was the home of the Pallacanestro Biella professional basketball team.

Indoor arenas in Italy
Basketball venues in Italy
Sport in Biella
Sports venues in Piedmont